Chulak Qapanuri (also Romanized as Chūlak Qapānūrī; also known as Chūlak and Chūlak-e Qabānūrī) is a village in Tariq ol Eslam Rural District, in the Central District of Nahavand County, Hamadan Province, Iran. At the 2006 census, its population was 456, in 132 families.

References 

Populated places in Nahavand County